Keagan Simmons (born 26 March 1999) is a West Indian cricketer. He made his List A debut for West Indies B in the 2018–19 Regional Super50 tournament on 3 October 2018. He was the leading run-scorer for West Indies B in the tournament, with 162 runs in five matches. Prior to his List A debut, he was named in the West Indies squad for the 2018 Under-19 Cricket World Cup. In November 2019, he was named in Trinidad and Tobago's squad for the 2019–20 Regional Super50 tournament. He made his first-class debut on 9 January 2020, for Trinidad and Tobago in the 2019–20 West Indies Championship.

References

External links
 

1999 births
Living people
West Indies B cricketers
Trinidad and Tobago cricketers
Place of birth missing (living people)